The Jesse M. Robredo Coliseum is an indoor sporting arena located in Naga City, Camarines Sur, Philippines. It is dubbed as The Big Dome of the South, being the largest indoor arena in Southern Luzon. It opened in August 2010 as Naga City Coliseum and has a maximum seating capacity of more than 12,000 spectators. Its construction started in 2009. On September 27, 2012, the coliseum was renamed in honor of the late former Mayor of Naga City and DILG Sec. Jesse M. Robredo who died in a plane crash.

Notable events
The arena is one of the venues that the Philippine Basketball Association uses in its regular out of town games.

The Members Church of God International popularly known as Ang Dating Daan gathered to hold its Bicol Division Thanksgiving last June 2014.

References

External links
 Arena plans

Basketball venues in the Philippines
Indoor arenas in the Philippines
Buildings and structures in Naga, Camarines Sur
Sports in Camarines Sur
2010 establishments in the Philippines
Sports venues completed in 2010